2 Birds 1 Stone is the third studio album by American rapper Stevie Stone. The album was released on August 13, 2013, by Strange Music. The album features guest appearances from Krizz Kaliko, Spaide R.I.P.P.E.R., Brotha Lynch Hung, Wrekonize, Bernz, ¡Mayday!, Mai Lee, Darrein, Tech N9ne, Rittz, Jarren Benton and  Ms. Kriss. The album debuted at number 76 on the Billboard 200 chart.

Commercial performance
The album debuted at number 76 on the Billboard 200 chart, with first-week sales of 4,700 copies in the United States.

Critical reception

Track listing

Charts

References

2013 albums
Albums produced by J. White Did It
Stevie Stone albums
Strange Music albums